Nehemiah Hiyya ben Moses Hayyun (ca. 1650 – ca. 1730) was a Bosnian Kabalist, described by scholars as linked to Sabbateanism. His parents, of Sephardic descent, lived in Sarajevo, Bosnia (then a part of the Ottoman Empire), where he was most likely born, though later in life he pretended that he was a Palestinian emissary born in Safed. He received his Talmudic education in Hebron.

Excommunicated at Jerusalem
In his eighteenth year he became rabbi of Uskup, in present-day Republic of North Macedonia (Üsküp - ). This position, however, he held only for a brief period. Thereafter he led a wandering life, as a merchant, as a scholar, or as a mendicant. In the guise of a saint he constantly sought adventures of love. From Uskup he went to Palestine, then to Egypt. In 1708 he made his appearance in Smyrna, where he won some adherents willing to help him publish his Mehemnuta de Kulla, and thus secure a rabbinical position for him. In this work he asserted that Judaism teaches a Trinitarian God. This God, he declared, embodies three faces ("Partzufim") – the Ancient of Days ("'Attiḳ"), the Holy King, and the Shekhinah. Ḥayyun's own part in this book consists only of two commentaries; the text was anonymously written by a Sabbatean pupil. Leaving Smyrna, Ḥayyun was led to Jerusalem with pomp and ceremony, but the rabbi of Smyrna, who had seen through his pretensions, warned the rabbis of Jerusalem of his heresies. The immediate consequence was that even before his arrival the rabbis of Jerusalem, though they had never read his work, excommunicated him as a "min," and condemned his book to be burned.

At Prague
Excommunicated, he met little sympathy anywhere (1709-1711). In Venice, however (1711), with the approval of the rabbis of that community, he had printed an extract from his work, under the title Raza di-Yiḥudah, into the beginning of which he had woven the first stanza of a lascivious Italian love-song, La Bella Margaritha, with a mystical hymn entitled Keter 'Elyon. In Prague, where he lived from 1711 until 1712, he found an appropriate soil for his teaching. Joseph Oppenheim, the son of David Oppenheim, received him. The Kabbalistic rabbi of Prague, Naphtali Cohen, was also greatly impressed with his personality. He even highly recommended his book, basing his judgment merely upon fraudulent testimonials. Here Ḥayyun delivered sermons which had a Shabbethaian background, and which he had printed in Berlin (1713) under the title Dibre Neḥemyah. Moreover, he played the role of a wizard, of one who had intercourse with Elijah, of a person capable of resurrecting the dead and of creating new worlds. By writing amulets he earned the money he needed for gambling. By fraudulent introductions he also managed to obtain friends in Vienna, Nikolsburg, Prossnitz, Breslau, Glogau, and Berlin, and formed political connections with Löbel Prossnitz of Moravia. In Berlin (1713), the community of which city was then split into two parties, he succeeded in having his book Mehemnuta de Kulla, or Oz le-Elohim, printed with the approval of the Berlin rabbi, Aaron Benjamin Wolf.

In Amsterdam
On the prestige he obtained from his book he now tried his fortune in Amsterdam. Almost from the outset he encountered the antagonism of Tzvi Ashkenazi, rabbi of the German congregation of Amsterdam, who mistook him for another Ḥayyun, an old enemy of his. Ḥayyun surrendered his book to the board of the Portuguese congregation in Amsterdam, in order to obtain permission to sell it. Distrusting their own rabbi, Solomon Ayllon, this board brought the matter before Tzvi Ashkenazi, who, of course, very soon detected its heretical character and called for its author's expulsion. At this point, however, Ayllon, under the threat of Ḥayyun to reveal his past life as a Shabbethaian to the whole of Amsterdam, became his defender, and made Ḥayyun's cause entirely his own and that of the Portuguese community. The result was that Ayllon was charged by the board of his synagogue to form a commission to reexamine Ḥayyun's book. Without awaiting the decision of this commission, Tzvi Ashkenazi and his anti-Shabbethaian friend Moses Hagiz excommunicated Ḥayyun (July 23, 1713). They published their decision, with various unjustified calumnies, in pamphlets, which, answered by counter pamphlets, greatly increased the ill feeling between the Portuguese and the German congregation.

Left Amsterdam
The Portuguese commission announced its decision on August 7, 1713. In spite of the objections of two members of the commission, one of them Ayllon's own son, they declared Ḥayyun entirely guiltless of heresy, and he was rehabilitated in a solemn assembly of the great Amsterdam synagogue. But Ḥayyun was excommunicated by many other outside congregations, and his disreputable antecedents and the deceptive means by which he acquired introductions were exposed, especially by Leon Brieli, the aged rabbi of Mantua. In spite of this the members of the Portuguese commission adhered to their decision, but felt themselves bound to publicly exonerate themselves, and for this purpose issued Ḳoshṭ Imre Emet, a pamphlet which was not without obvious misstatements. Protected by the Portuguese, Ḥayyun could even insult his opponents in pamphlets, and did so. He attacked Tzvi Ashkenazi, in Ha-Tzad Tzvi, Amsterdam, 1713; Joseph Ergas, in Shalhebet Yah and Ketobet Ḳa'ḳa; Tzvi Ashkenazi, Moses Ḥagiz, and Leon Brieli, in Pitḳa Min Shemaya; Moses Ḥagiz, in Iggeret Shebuḳin, Amsterdam, 1714. At last, however, Ḥayyun left for the Orient, and every one felt relieved. The introductions given him by his supporters were of little avail; wherever he went the doors were barred against him.

In August 1724, through the influence of a vizier, he succeeded at Constantinople in absolving himself from the excommunication on the condition that he should abstain from teaching, writing, and preaching on cabalistic subjects. Under oath he promised this, but subsequently broke his word. Thus rehabilitated, he went to Vienna and managed, by urging his Trinitarian teachings and professing his intention to convert the Jews to Christianity, to obtain a letter of protection from the Austrian emperor, although he secretly sympathized with the Shabbethaians and still openly professed to be an Orthodox Jew. But his game had been played. Before the walls of Prague he faced starvation. In Berlin, he threatened to profess Christianity if support were denied him. His friends in Amsterdam, even Ayllon, thus forsook him. In April 1726, he was excommunicated in Hamburg and finally in Altona. He fled to North Africa, where he died. His son turned Christian, and endeavored to revenge his father by allegedly-calumnious attacks on Judaism.

Jewish Encyclopedia bibliography
Johann Christoph Wolf, Bibliotheca Hebræa iii.828 et seq., iv.928 et seq.;
Jost, Geschichte des Israelitischen Volkes, ii.363 et seq., 468 et seq.;
—, Geschichte des Judenthums und Seiner Sekten, iii.177 et seq.;
D. Kahana, Eben ha-Ṭo'im, pp. 64 et seq.;
Jacob Emden, Megillat Sefer, ed. Kahana, pp. 25, 30-32, 34, 39, 58, 117, 118;
Adolf Neubauer, Cat. Bodl. Hebr. MSS. p. 760;
Heinrich Graetz, Geschichte x.309 et seq., 468 et seq.;
Leser Landshuth, Ammude ha-'Abodah, p. 282;
Joseph Perles, Geschichte der Juden in Posen, pp. 79 et seq.;
Moritz Steinschneider, Cat. Bodl. cols. 2054 et seq.;
Winter and Wünsche, Die Jüdische Litteratur, ii.73;
Miktab me-R. Abraham Segre, in Berliner's Magazin, Hebr. part, 1890, xvii.15;
D. Kaufmann, Samson Wertheimer, p. 97, note 1;
—, in Ha-Ḥoḳer, ii.11, Vienna, 1894;
Abraham Berliner, Geschichte der Juden in Rom, ii.75;
Ha-Tzad Tzvi, Preface, Amsterdam, 1713.

References

1650s births
1730s deaths
Rabbis from Sarajevo
Rabbis in Hebron
Bosnia and Herzegovina Sephardi Jews
Sephardi rabbis
Kabbalists
17th-century rabbis from the Ottoman Empire
18th-century rabbis from the Ottoman Empire
17th-century Sephardi Jews
18th-century Sephardi Jews
Sephardi Jews from the Ottoman Empire
Sabbateans